Denham Price (22 January 1940 – 24 June 2013) was a South African cricketer. He played two first-class matches for Border in 1964/65.

References

External links
 

1940 births
2013 deaths
South African cricketers
Border cricketers
People from Queenstown, South Africa
Cricketers from the Eastern Cape